Fugitive Lady, Italian: , is a 1950 crime–drama film directed by Sidney Salkow and Marino Girolami (Uncredited). It stars Janis Paige, Binnie Barnes, and Massimo Serato. Fugitive Lady is based on the novel Dark Road by Doris Miles Disney. Film editing was done by Nino Baragli. It was shot at the Scalera Studios in Rome.

Plot
The wealthy industrialist Ralph Clementi (Eduardo Ciannelli) after being released from a tavern in a drunken state he leaves his car near Rome, but came close to Lake Nemi , not noticing the broken road, he plunges into a ravine: the Ralph dies. Since he had taken out insurance on the life of himself in the amount of £100,000, his wife Barbara (Janis Paige) is going to collect the prize of the policy. Jack Di Marco (Tony Cento), insurance investigator, also thanks to the half-sister of the victim, Esther (Binnie Barnes), which appears detached from the sister-in-law and her fake pain, investigates the history of the protagonists. Esther secretly harbored feelings for her half-brother, now no longer young, but Ralph was in love with Barbara, a singer in nightclubs, and he married her. But over time the affection of Barbara at her husband had been reduced to a forced patience; in her life she had returned to her former lover, Jim West (Massimo Serato). Discovered by Ralph, she tried to get a divorce from him, but the man denied the satisfaction. Unable to separate from him legally, she decided to get rid of him. In a stormy night, she led a drunk Ralph to get into the car; two exchanged signs were the cause of the accident. Jim, who was also unaware of the intent of the fact, thanks to a confession of the villa caretaker, he feels that in planning the incident was Barbara. With these, disgusted about the perfidy of woman abandons her, she shoots him to death behind him. At the sight of Jack, who secretly has witnessed the murder, Barbara flees from the villa by car, but perishes in the same incident, which she herself organized, that happened to her husband.

Cast
 Janis Paige as Barbara Clementi
 Binnie Barnes as Esther Clementi
 Massimo Serato as Jim West
 Eduardo Ciannelli as Ralph Clementi
 Tony Cento as Jack De Marco
 Alba Arnova as Francine
 Dino Galvani as Giuseppe
 Rosina Galli as Teresa
 John Fostini as Beppo
 Luciana Danieli as Maria
 Michael Tor as Bob
 Alex Serberoli as Chauffeur
 Joop van Hulsen as Druggist
 Giulio Marchetti as Giovanni

Reception

Critical response
The New York Times staff wrote in a review of Fugitive Lady: "Mr. Frankovitch has unwound this meandering claptrap, which is recounted in an interminable series of flashbacks by practically everybody in the cast, against the eye-popping magnificence of Rome's cafe society playground. John O'Dea has pounded out a laboriously one-dimensional scenario, Sidney Salkow's direction is vacuous and fumbling and the cast responds accordingly. As the passion-blinded spouse, Eduardo Ciannelli grits his teeth and grins like an agonized possum. Binnie Barnes, who is also Mrs. Frankovitch, does a stiff but at least restrained job as his protecting sister. And Massimo Serato makes an honest but unsustained try as the gigolo. But Miss Paige, who ranges from Louisa M. Alcott demureness to snarling tantrums, takes the cake for water-level histrionics. Just why Mr. Frankovitch bothered with such a diabolically dull heroine is anyone's guess. Maybe Doris Miles Disney, who wrote the original novel, knows. At any rate, somebody should have opened a window to let in some more air—and scenery."

References

Sources

External links
 

1950 films
Republic Pictures films
Films directed by Sidney Salkow
1950 crime drama films
Italian crime drama films
British crime drama films
1950s English-language films
Films shot at Scalera Studios
Italian black-and-white films
British black-and-white films
1950s British films
1950s Italian films